James Patrick Otis (March 16, 1948 – March 3, 2020) was an American film and television actor.

Born in Stamford, Connecticut, Otis began his film career in the 1970s, where he first appeared in the film Dragonfly in 1976, then made other films until 1998, when he made his first appearance in television. It was in Profiler, and he starred in one episode.

In 1999, Otis appeared in three episodes of Star Trek: Deep Space Nine. In 2006, Otis appeared in the true story film The Black Dahlia, which starred Josh Hartnett and Scarlett Johansson.

Otis also appeared in The Prestige, which starred Hugh Jackman and Christian Bale. Otis performed in numerous audio plays for Peabody-winner Yuri Rasovsky. Otis appeared in the film Nite Tales: The Movie, which was released in December 2007. Otis died on March 3, 2020, at the age of 71 following an illness.

Filmography 
Supernatural (2010) (TV series) — Famine (1 Episode)
Dark Streets (2008) — Tommy
Nite Tales: The Movie (2008)
Criminal Minds (2007) (TV series) — Dr. Nash (1 episode)
Cold Case (2007) (TV series) — Lloyd Jordan (1 episode)
Dark Streets (2007) — Tommy
The Prestige (2006) — Blind Stagehand 1
The Black Dahlia (2006) — Dolph Bleichert
ER (2005) (TV series) — Arnold Brixton (1 episode)
Promised Land (2004/I) — Ray
Law & Order: Special Victims Unit (2003) (TV series) — Reverend Mitchell Shaw (1 episode)
The Kiss (2003) (V) — Ray
Inhabited (2003) (V) — Mr. Stevenson
The X Files (2001) (TV series) — Arlen Sacks (1 episode)
Getting Away with Murder: The JonBenet Ramsey Mystery (2000) (TV) -
Star Trek: Deep Space Nine (1999) (TV series) — Solbor (3 episodes)
Henry: Portrait of a Serial Killer, Part II (1998) — Homeless Shelter Man #1
Profiler (1998) (TV series) — Conner Drake (1 episode)
Another Day in Paradise (1997) — Reverend
Lasting Silents (1997) — Jimmy Goodnews
The Fence (1994) — Railroad Worker #2
The Kill Reflex (1989) — Junk Yard Man
Stardust Memories (1980) — UFO Follower
Dragonfly (1976) — Clifford

References

External links 

American male film actors
American male television actors
American people of Swiss descent
Male actors from New York City
1948 births
2020 deaths
Male actors from Stamford, Connecticut